The hogfish (Lachnolaimus maximus), also known as boquinete, doncella de pluma or pez perro in Mexico is a species of wrasse native to the Western Atlantic Ocean, living in a range from Nova Scotia, Canada, to northern South America, including the Gulf of Mexico.  This species occurs around reefs, especially preferring areas with plentiful gorgonians. It is a carnivore which feeds on molluscs, as well as crabs and sea urchins. This species is currently the only known member of its genus.

Appearance
The hogfish possesses a very elongated snout, which it uses to search for crustaceans buried in the sediment. This very long "pig-like" snout and its rooting behavior give the hogfish its name. A prominent black spot behind the pectoral fins differentiates males from females. The dorsal fin usually is composed of three or four long dorsal spines followed by a series of shorter dorsal spines. Hogfish reach a maximum of 91 cm (36 in) in total length and a weight of about 11 kg (24 lb). Females and juveniles usually start out as pale gray, brown, or reddish-brown in color, with a paler underside and no distinct patterns. Males are distinguished by a deep, dark band spanning from the snout to the first dorsal spine, and by a lateral black spot behind the pectoral fins. Hogfish also have a form of active camouflage to blend in against coral or sand.

Hunted
Hogfish are commonly targeted by many spear and reef fishermen and are regarded highly by many for their taste and food value. In 2007, the Florida landings of hogfish totaled 306,953 pounds.

Lifecycle
Like many wrasses, the hogfish is a sequential hermaphrodite, meaning it changes sex during different life stages; it is a protogynous, "first female" hermaphrodite; juvenile hogfish start out as female and then mature to become male. The change usually occurs around three years of age and about 14 inches in length. Hogfish have been recorded to live up to 11 years. Spawning in South Florida occurs from November through June. Hogfish social groups are organized into harems where one male will mate and protect a group of females in his territory.

Economic importance
In 2007, the Florida landings of hogfish totaled 306,953 pounds. The fish stocks are regulated by the South Atlantic Fishery Management Council and Florida Fish and Wildlife Conservation Commission.  Bag, size, and gear limits all have been placed on this species to ensure a healthy stock and to protect it from overfishing.

References

External links
 Florida Museum of Natural History: Hogfish
 

Labridae
Fish of the Eastern United States
Fish of the Western Atlantic
Fish described in 1792
Taxa named by Johann Julius Walbaum